The AMY detector was used by particle physicists at the TRISTAN electron-positron collider at KEK in Japan between 1984 and 1995 to search for new particles and perform precision studies of the strong and electroweak forces.  

It was built and operated by physicists from many countries, including: the USA, Japan, South Korea, China, and the Philippines. For tracking charged particles, the detector contained an Inner Tracking Chamber and a Central Drift Chamber.  A novel X-ray detector, sensitive to x-rays produced by electrons via synchrotron radiation in AMY's 3Tesla solenoidal magnet, was used for electron identification.  The Barrel electromagnetic calorimeter was a sampling calorimeter using lead as its passive material and gas for sampling.  AMY also had a muon detection system outside of the magnet return yoke.

Its most highly cited paper is "Multi - hadron event properties in e+e− annihilation at s√=52 GeV to 57-GeV"

While the names of most particle physics experiments are acronyms, AMY is just AMY.

References

External Links 
Record for AMY --- A HIGH RESOLUTION LEPTON DETECTOR FOR TRISTAN, KEK-TE-003 experiment on INSPIRE-HEP 
Particle physics facilities
Particle experiments